Pyrgocythara dubia is a species of sea snail, a marine gastropod mollusk in the family Mangeliidae.

Description

Distribution
This marine species occurs off Jamaica.

References

 Adams, Charles Baker. "Specierum novarum conchyliorum." Jamaica repertorum, synopsis. Proceedings of the Boston Society of Natural History 2.1 (1845): 17.

Further reading
 

dubia
Gastropods described in 1845